Gunnlaugur Jónasson (born 9 April 1962) is an Icelandic sailor. He competed at the 1984 Summer Olympics and the 1988 Summer Olympics.

References

External links
 

1962 births
Living people
Icelandic male sailors (sport)
Olympic sailors of Iceland
Sailors at the 1984 Summer Olympics – 470
Sailors at the 1988 Summer Olympics – 470
Place of birth missing (living people)